TF2 or TF.2  may refer to:

Aircraft 
 Sopwith TF.2 Salamander, a British World War I aircraft
 Westland Wyvern TF.2,

Entertainment 
 Team Fortress 2, a 2007 video game developed by Valve
 Transformers: Revenge of the Fallen, a 2009 film
 Titanfall 2, a 2016 video game developed by Respawn Entertainment
 Transport Fever 2, a 2019 video game developed by Urban Games

See also 
 
 (162015) , a minor planet